Scarfiotti is an Italian surname. Notable people with the surname include:

 Ferdinando Scarfiotti (1941–1994), Italian art director and production designer
 Ludovico Scarfiotti (1933–1968), Italian Formula One and sports car driver

Italian-language surnames